Herbert Klang (born 1908, date of death unknown) was an Austrian ice hockey player. He competed in the men's tournament at the 1928 Winter Olympics. Klang also won ten caps for the national team, and played at the 1929 Ice Hockey European Championship.

References

External links
 

1908 births
Year of death missing
Olympic ice hockey players of Austria
Ice hockey players at the 1928 Winter Olympics
Ice hockey people from Vienna